The golden-breasted bunting (Emberiza flaviventris) is a passerine bird in the bunting family Emberizidae. It occurs in dry open woodlands and moist savanna in Africa south of the Sahara, but is absent from the equatorial forest belt.

Description
The golden-breasted bunting is 15–16 cm long. The adult male has striking head pattern with a white crown, black lateral crown stripes, white supercilium and black-bordered white ear coverts. The underparts are orange-yellow becoming yellow on the throat and whitish on the lower belly. The upperparts are chestnut with a grey rump. The browner wings have two conspicuous white wing bars. The sexes are very similar, but females may have a buff tone to the white head markings and browner head stripes, and the back may have dark streaks.  Young birds are duller and paler than the females.

Subspecies
There are three subspecies:
  E. f. flaviventris, the nominate subspecies, occurs from the Cape to southern South Sudan
  E. f. flavigaster occurs along a narrow belt across the Sahel, and its range is discontinuous with respect to the other subspecies
  E. f. princeps occurs in southern Angola and Namibia.

E. f. princeps is similar to the nominate subspecies, but larger, and paler below. E. f. flavigaster is more distinctive, having a paler, redder back, pale grey rump, paler yellow underparts and whiter flanks.

Habitat
This species is found in a variety of open woodlands. The subspecies flavigaster favours acacia steppe and savannah, with the other subspecies occurring in a wider range of lightly wooded country including gardens.

Behaviour

The golden-breasted bunting's call is a nasal ascending zzhrr. The song is variable, but includes a weechee weechee weechee.

The golden-breasted bunting builds an untidy cup nest lined with fine grass or hair low in a shrub or sapling. The two or three eggs are glossy white or cream and marked with black lines. The eggs hatch in 12–13 days and the chicks fledge in another 16–17 days.

The golden-breasted bunting is not gregarious, and is normally seen alone, in pairs or small groups. It feeds on the ground on seeds, insects and spiders, animal prey being taken mostly when the birds have young. This species is generally resident, but there appears to be degree of local movement. It is often quite tame.

References

 Byers, Olsson and Curson, Buntings and Sparrows 
 Ian Sinclair, Phil Hockey and Warwick Tarboton, SASOL Birds of Southern Africa (Struik 2002)

External links
 Golden-breasted bunting - Species text in The Atlas of Southern African Birds.

golden-breasted bunting
Birds of Sub-Saharan Africa
golden-breasted bunting
Birds of East Africa